Operation Frühlingssonne was the code name for military plan created by Paul von Hindenburg, during the 1918–1919 Greater Poland uprising, according to which, Weimar Republic and Russian SFSR were meant attack Second Polish Republic.

The operation 
According to the plan of the operation, Germany would attack Poland in a few outflanking points: Suwałki and Grodno, Toruń and Upper Silesia, heading to Warsaw. On 21 June 1919 AKO Süd ordered the realization of the plan. The next day, German aircraft had crossed the Polish border, in the region of Częstochowa. From 23 to 27 June, German troops had fought with the Polish army near Bolesławiec and Wieruszów.

The operation was canceled in late June, and on 28 June 1919, Germany had signed the Treaty of Versailles, ending any plans of continuation of conflict against Poland.

Citations

Notes

References

Bibliography 
Encyklopedia Białych Plam, vol. 18.

Cancelled invasions
Cancelled military operations involving Germany
Code names